John Edward Andrews (born 3 February 1950) is an English former footballer who played as a goalkeeper. He played for York City in the English Football League and he later worked as a referee.

Career
Andrews was born in York, North Yorkshire and played for Moor Lane Youth Club before joining hometown club York City in August 1968 as an amateur. Following an injury to goalkeeper Bob Widdowson, Andrews made his first team debut in a Fourth Division match against Rochdale on 5 April 1969, which was lost 2–1. He featured in all of York's remaining games of the 1968–69 season, making 11 appearances. He was not retained by the club after the end of the season.  he was working as a referee in the York Football League.

References

1950 births
Living people
Footballers from York
English footballers
Association football goalkeepers
York City F.C. players
English Football League players
English football referees